Saint-Sébastien-sur-Loire (literally Saint-Sébastien on Loire) is a commune in the Loire-Atlantique department in western France.

It is the third-largest suburb of the city of Nantes, and is adjacent to it on the southeast, across the river Loire. It has two railway stations on the line to Clisson: Saint-Sébastien-Pas-Enchantés and Saint-Sébastien-Frêne-Rond.

The territory of the commune was occupied at the earliest 3,000 years before our era. 

During the Revolution, despite its proximity to Nantes, the commune sided massively against the Republic and joined the Vendée insurrection of March 1793.

Population

Twin towns - sister cities
Saint-Sébastien-sur-Loire is twinned with:
 Cernavodă, Romania
 Glinde, Germany
 Kaposvár, Hungary
 Kati, Mali
 Porthcawl, Wales, United Kingdom

Personalities
Héloïse Adelaïde Letissier(born 1 June 1988) (age 31),professionally known as Christine and the Queens or simply Chris, is a French singer, songwriter and producer.
Clara Hervouet
Giovanni Sio (born 31 March 1989), footballer
Nates Geovannie, rugby player

See also
Communes of the Loire-Atlantique department

References

External links
 Official website 

Saintsebastiensurloire